Libri may refer to:

People
 Domenico Libri, an Italian criminal
 Girolamo dai Libri, an Italian illuminator
 Francesco dai Libri, an Italian illuminator, father of Girolamo dai Libri
 Guglielmo Libri Carucci dalla Sommaja, a 19th-century Italian count and infamous book thief

Books
 Libri Carolini, composed on the command of Charlemagne
 Libri Feudorum, a twelfth-century collection, originating in Lombardy, of feudal customs
 Libri of Aleister Crowley is a list of texts mostly written or adapted by Aleister Crowley

Other
 Libri Prohibiti, a nonprofit, private, independent, archival research library located in Prague, Czech Republic
 Libri, an academic journal established in 1950

See also
 Libris (disambiguation)